James Murrell "Jake" Jones (November 23, 1920 – December 13, 2000) was a first baseman in Major League Baseball who played between  and  for the Chicago White Sox (1941–42, 1946–47) and Boston Red Sox (1947–48). Listed at 6'3", 197 lb., Jones batted and threw right-handed. He was born in Epps, Louisiana.

Career
Jones was a highly decorated World War II veteran. He played 10 games in the American League for Chicago, in part of two seasons, before enlisting in the United States Navy right after Pearl Harbor attack. He joined the service on June 30, 1942, becoming an aviator. In November 1943 he was assigned to the unit on the USS Yorktown (CV-10), flying Grumman F6F Hellcat fighters.

Between November and December 1944, Jones destroyed two Japanese A6M Zero and damaged one of them. On February 1, 1945, he shot down another three Zeroes while serving on a mission at northeast of Tokyo, to give him five confirmed victories. A day later, he annihilated other Zero and a Nakajima Ki-43. Then, on February 25 he received a half-share of a probable Ki-43.

For his heroic action, Jones was awarded the Silver Star, two Distinguished Flying Cross and four Air Medals.

Following his service discharge, Jones returned to play for Chicago in 1946. During the 1947 midseason he was dealt to the Boston Red Sox in exchange for Rudy York, batting a combined .237 with 19 home runs and 96 RBI that season. He hit .200 in 36 games for Boston in 1948, his last major league season, and finished his baseball career in 1949, dividing his playing time between the Texas League and American Association.

Jones died in his hometown of Epps, Louisiana at age 80.

References
Baseball in Wartime

Boston Red Sox players
Chicago White Sox players
Major League Baseball first basemen
Recipients of the Distinguished Flying Cross (United States)
Recipients of the Silver Star
Baseball players from Louisiana
People from West Carroll Parish, Louisiana
1920 births
2000 deaths
United States Navy pilots of World War II
United States Navy officers
Recipients of the Air Medal
American World War II flying aces